Tsay Keh Airport  is a registered aerodrome located on the banks of the Finlay River in British Columbia, Canada. The older Ingenika Airport nearby is no longer in regular use, but is maintained as an alternative, since visibility is sometimes acceptable there when it is not at Tsay Keh Airport.

References

Registered aerodromes in British Columbia
Peace River Regional District